Loomis may refer to:

Places

Canada
Loomis, Saskatchewan

United States
Loomis, California
Loomis, Michigan
Loomis, Nebraska
Loomis, New York, a hamlet in Liberty, New York
Loomis, South Dakota
Loomis, Washington
Loomis, Wisconsin
Loomis Chaffee, a school in Windsor, Connecticut, originally known as The Loomis Institute
Loomis Museum, an historical homestead museum in California
Loomis station, a former train station and mansion in Washington
Loomis station (CTA Englewood branch), a former Chicago 'L' train station

Structures
Loomis Homestead, Windsor, Connecticut
Capt. James Loomis House, Windsor, Connecticut
Loomis-Parry Residence, Augusta, Kansas
Fowler-Loomis House, Oswego County, New York
Robert and Mabel Loomis House, Hood River, Oregon

People
 See Loomis (surname)

Television and film
The surname Loomis has become something of a trope in horror films, with characters in the Psycho, Halloween, Scream and Dark Shadows films or franchises carrying the name.  Dr Samuel Loomis in Halloween was directly named after the character in Psycho.

 Billy Loomis, a character in the first installment of Scream
 Lila Loomis (née Crane), a character in Psycho and Psycho II
 Loomis (TV pilot), failed 2000s TV pilot starring Cheri Oteri
 Oswald Loomis, Superman villain the Prankster
 Sam Loomis, a character in Psycho
 Dr. Samuel Loomis, a character in the Halloween film series
 "Deanie" Loomis, protagonist in Splendor in the Grass played by Natalie Wood
 Willie Loomis, a character in the TV series and movies Dark Shadows
 ‘The Loomis Case’ was an historical spree-killing in an hotel referred to in the episode “Terminus” in series 8 of ‘’Endeavour’’.

Business
 Loomis Express, a Canadian courier service subsidiary of TFI International
 Loomis (company), a cash handling company, formerly a subsidiary of Securitas AB
 Loomis, Sayles & Company, an American investment management firm

See also 
 Loomis Gang, a family of outlaws in New York during the 19th century
 Samuel Loomis (disambiguation)